Bufalo Bill is an album of Italian singer-songwriter Francesco De Gregori. It was released in 1976 by RCA Italia. The title is an intentional misspelling of Buffalo Bill's name: buffalo is often rendered in Italian as "bufalo", although specifically defining a different animal in that language.

The cover is a portrait by American artist Gil Elvgren, from a 1948 magazine.

The album
The album include some of the most popular De Gregori songs, including the title track (a ballad about a disillusioned Buffalo Bill and about contradictions of the American myth, partially inspired by the Sam Peckinpah film The Ballad of Cable Hogue), the romantic "Atlantide" and the desperate anthem "Santa Lucia".

"Festival" is about the suicide of singer-songwriter Luigi Tenco at the Sanremo Festival, and the hypocrisy with which media dealt with that event.

The music of "Giovane esploratore Tobia" was co-written with Lucio Dalla, who had also collaborated with two songs on the previous De Gregori album, Rimmel.

Personnel
Mario Scotti – Bass
Roberto "Bob Rose" Rosati – Guitar
Carlo Felice Marcovecchio – Drums
Antonio "Toto" Torquati – Hammond organ
Baba Yaga – Voices

Track listing 

 "Bufalo Bill" 
"Giovane esploratore Tobia" 
"L'uccisione di Babbo Natale " 
"Disastro aereo sul canale di Sicilia"
"Ninetto e la colonia"
"Atlantide" 
"Ipercarmela" 
"Ultimo discorso registrato" 
"Festival"  
"Santa Lucia"

All songs written by Francesco De Gregori, apart "Giovane esploratore Tobia", music co-written by Lucio Dalla.

External links
Bufalo Bill lyrics
Recension of "L'uccisione di Babbo Natale" 

1976 albums
Francesco De Gregori albums
RCA Records albums